Bahubalinagar is a suburb of Jalahalli in North Bangalore, Karnataka, India. Bahubalinagar is dotted by several small-scale industries, film production houses and residential layouts.

References

Neighbourhoods in Bangalore